Business and Society Review is a peer-reviewed academic journal covering ethical issues concerning the relationships between business and society. It is published by Wiley-Blackwell on behalf of The Center for Business Ethics at Bentley University. The current editor-in-chief is Robert E. Frederick (Bentley University). It was founded by Theodore Cross.

References

External links

Wiley-Blackwell academic journals
English-language journals
Quarterly journals
Business and management journals
Ethics journals
Publications with year of establishment missing
Bentley University